Kandak Sema (Like a Mountain) is an upcoming Sri Lankan Sinhalese language romantic drama film directed by Asoka Athaudahetti and co-directed by Tao Nashimotho. Kandak Sema co produced by Sumithra Rahubaddhe , Jayantha Hettiarachchi, Ashu Marasinghe and Samanmalee Padmakumara .the executive producer of the film is Sumithra Rahubaddhe.  It stars Nirosha Perera and Japanese actor Jun Etoh in lead roles along with Japanese actress Ayako Kobayashi with Bimal Jayakody in supportive roles. Music composed by Suresh Maliyadde. The film is based on the novel written by Sumithra Rahubaddhe and the script also goes to her credit.

Plot

Cast
 Nirosha Perera as Nupa
 Jun Etoh as Masaya San
 Ayako Kobayashi as Sora San
 Dineth De Silva		
 Bimal Jayakody as Sumal
 Cyril Wickramage		
 Veena Jayakody		
 Chandani Seneviratne		
 Wasantha Kotuwella		
 Kaushalya Fernando	
 Priyankara Rathnayake	
 Vishwajith Gunasekara		
 Jayani Senanayake		
 Dasun Pathirana		
 Lakshman Mendis		
 Pubudu Chathuranga

Production
Kandak Sema is a 2009 novel by Sri Lankan author Sumithra Rahubaddhe. The book won all five awards in 2010 from five literary festivals in Sri Lanka. It is about a young Sri Lankan woman from an impoverished family who marries a Japanese farmer to escape poverty. The book was adapted into the film where popular Oshin actress, Ayako Kobayashi made her acting debut in Sri Lankan Sinhala language cinema in a supporting role.

References

External links
 
 Kandak Sema on YouTube

Sinhala-language films
Sri Lankan drama films